Reginald Clive Bell (11 December 1894 – 19 November 1960) was a New Zealand rugby union player and cricketer. He was a member of the New Zealand national side, the All Blacks, in 1922, playing eight matches (no tests). He played four first-class matches for Otago between 1914 and 1921.

References

External links
 

1894 births
1960 deaths
New Zealand cricketers
Otago cricketers
Cricketers from Tasmania
People from Burnie, Tasmania